Forgione is a surname. Notable people with the surname include:

Bob Forgione (1929–1994), American comic book and comic strip artist
Carl Forgione (1944–1998), British actor
Francesco Forgione:
Francesco Forgione (Padre Pio, or Saint Pio of Pietrelcina), Italian priest
Francesco Forgione (politician) (born 1960), Italian politician
Larry Forgione (born 1952), American chef
Marc Forgione (born 1978), American chef